The VEF I-15 was a Latvian advanced trainer aircraft of the 1930s.  Two examples of the I-15, a small, single-engined monoplane were built by the VEF to the designs of Kārlis Irbītis and were used by the Latvian Air Force

Development and design
In 1938, the Latvian aircraft designer Kārlis Irbītis, working at the Valsts Elektrotehniskā Fabrika (VEF) at Riga commenced design of a single-seat advanced trainer as a follow on to his earlier, similar VEF I-14 aircraft.  The I-15 was a low-winged monoplane of all-wooden construction, powered by a single de Havilland Gipsy Six air-cooled engine, and fitted with a fixed tailwheel undercarriage.

In April 1939, the first prototype, the I-15a, powered by a 200 hp (149 kW) Gypsy Six I driving a two-bladed fixed-pitch wooden propeller, made its maiden flight, while a second prototype, the I-15b, was powered by a 220 hp (167 kW) Gypsy Six II engine driving a variable-pitch propeller, and armed with a single synchronised machine gun followed, this demonstrating improved performance.

The two I-15 prototypes were transferred to the Latvian Air Force for use as advanced trainers, while a further two aircraft, to be designated I-15bis and powered by Hispano-Suiza 6 Mb engines were ordered by the Air Force, but on 17 June 1940, the Soviet Union occupied Latvia, ordering all aviation related work to be stopped.

Specifications (I-15b)

Notes

References

 Davis, Chuck. "Latvia's Little Hawk". Air Enthusiast, Forty-eight, December 1992 to February 1993. . pp. 58–64.
"Plane Facts:Latvian lightweight". Air International, January 1979, Vol. 16 No. 1. pp. 45–46.

External links
VEF I–15 Latvian aircraft (In Latvian)

1930s Latvian military trainer aircraft
Low-wing aircraft
Single-engined tractor aircraft
VEF aircraft